Route 62 is a tourist route in South Africa that meanders between Cape Town, Oudtshoorn, the Garden Route, and Gqeberha (formerly Port Elizabeth), offering the scenic alternative to the N2 highway. Route 62 is named for the R62 provincial route, which it follows from Montagu to Humansdorp, but the tourist route extends further along other highways to Cape Town and Gqeberha.

Also known as the Wine Route, Route 62 leads through the wine-growing areas of Wellington, Tulbagh, Worcester, Robertson and the Klein Karoo and is thus one of the longest wine routes in the world. Activities along Route 62 include wine tours, safari drives, tribal art, cultural tours, museums, hiking, mountain climbing, 4x4 routes, canoeing, horse riding, ostrich riding, fishing, caving, and even skydiving.

Route 62 spans a distance of 850 km from Cape Town to Gqeberha.

Places of interest 
Between Cape Town and Gqeberha you will be able to stop in the following towns:
Montagu - with its thermal baths and fruit trees
Barrydale and Ladismith - beautiful towns, extremely popular amongst hikers
Zoar and Amalienstein - former mission stations
Calitzdorp - the centre of the South African Port wine production
Oudtshoorn  - South African centre of Ostrich breeding and cave exploring
Robertson - The valley of wine and roses

External links

 Route 62 tourist route
 Tours and accommodation along Route 62
 Skydive Robertson Website
Tourism in the Western Cape